The Catalogue of Ships (neōn katálogos) is an epic catalogue in Book 2 of Homer's Iliad (2.494–759), which lists the contingents of the Achaean army that sailed to Troy. The catalogue gives the names of the leaders of each contingent, lists the settlements in the kingdom represented by the contingent, sometimes with a descriptive epithet that fills out a half-verse or articulates the flow of names and parentage and place, and gives the number of ships required to transport the men to Troy, offering further differentiations of weightiness. A similar, though shorter, Catalogue of the Trojans and their allies follows (2.816–877). A similar catalogue appears in the Pseudo-Apollodoran Bibliotheca.

Historical background

In the debate since antiquity over the Catalogue of Ships, the core questions have concerned the extent of historical credibility of the account, whether it was composed by Homer himself, to what extent it reflects a pre-Homeric document or memorized tradition, surviving perhaps in part from Mycenaean times, or whether it is a result of post-Homeric development. Dörpfeld notes that while in Odyssey Odysseus's kingdom includes Ithaca, Same, Dulichium, and Zacynthus, the Catalogue of Ships contains a different list of islands, again Ithaca, Same, and Zacynthus but now also Neritum, Krocylea, and Aegilips. The separate debate over the identity of Homer and the authorship of the Iliad and the Odyssey is conventionally termed "the Homeric Question".

The consensus before the mid-twentieth century was that the Catalogue of Ships was not the work of the man who composed the Iliad, though great pains had been taken to render it a work of art; furthermore, that the material of the text is essentially Mycenaean or sub-Mycenaean, while disagreement centers largely on the extent of later additions.

If taken to be an accurate account, the Catalogue provides a rare summary of the geopolitical situation in early Greece at some time between the Late Bronze Age and the eighth century BCE. Following Milman Parry's theory of Homeric oral poetry, some scholars, such as Denys Page, argue that it represents a pre-Homeric recitation incorporated into the epic by Homer. A few argue that parts of the recitation, such as the formulae describing places, date as early as the time of the Trojan War in the mid-13th century BCE, or possibly before. Others contend that the Catalogue is based on the time of Homer himself in the eighth century BCE and represents an anachronistic attempt to impose contemporary information on events five centuries earlier.

An intermediate theory is that the catalogue developed through a process of accretion during the poem's oral transmission and reflects gradual inclusion of the homelands of local sponsors by individual singers. In the most recent extended study of the Catalogue, Edzard Visser, of the University of Basel, concludes that the Catalogue is compatible with the rest of the Iliad in its techniques of verse improvisation, that the order of the names is meaningful and that the geographical epithets evince concrete geographical knowledge.  Visser argues that this knowledge was transmitted by the heroic myth, elements of which introduce each geographical section. W. W. Minton places the catalogue within similar "enumerations" in Homer and Hesiod, and suggests that part of their purpose was to impress the audience with a display of the performer's memory.

The most striking feature of the catalogue's geography is that it does not portray Greece in the Iron Age, the time of Homer. By then a tribal identity called the Dorians had enveloped western Greece, the Peloponnesus and Crete, while the shores of Ionia were densely populated by a people claiming to descend from families in the now-Dorian regions of Greece.  The whole northwestern part of Greece is not mentioned and it is these peoples (Epirotes, Macedonians, some Thessalians etc.) who are thought to be of Dorian descent.

Instead the catalogue portrays a loose union of city-states, mostly in mainland Greece, ruled by hereditary families under the overlordship of the High King (ánax) of Mycenae. Hardly any of them are Dorian.  The Ionian Greeks are mainly missing. This political snapshot is possibly one intended to be of Late Bronze Age Greece.

The Catalogue was an important source for solving geopolitical matters. When the Athenians claimed Salamis they cited the Catalogue of Ships which listed it among the Athenian troops, as proof of its moral allegiance to Athens

Catalogue
In the Iliad, the Greek Catalogue lists twenty-nine contingents under 46 captains, accounting for a total of 1,186 ships. Using the Boeotian figure of 120 men per ship results in a total of 142,320 men transported to the Troad. They are named by various ethnonyms and had lived in 164 places described by toponyms. The majority of these places have been identified and were occupied in the Late Bronze Age. The terms Danaans, Argives and Achaeans or the sons of the Achaeans are used for the army as a whole. In his Library, Apollodorus lists thirty contingents under 43 leaders with a total of 1013 ships, Hyginus lists 1154 ships, although the total is given as only 245 ships.

Authenticity question
Some scholars debate whether the Catalogue of Ships was a later addition to the Iliad from some time after the composition of the main work. Evidence for this, they suggest, is the inconsistencies between the Catalogue and the rest of the text and also the odd way it is inserted into the poem.

See also 
 Trojan Battle Order
 Catalogue of Women by Hesiod

Notes

References

Literature

External links
Detailed map of Achaeans and Trojans

Trojan War
Iliad
Lists of ancient Indo-European peoples and tribes
Iolcus